Kuren may refer to:
 Korand, Golestan, also known as Kuren, a village in Korand Rural District, Golestan Province, Iran
 Kuren (singer), Australian singer